The 2012 Co-operative Funeralcare Scottish Men's Curling Championship was held from February 13 to 19 at the Dewars Centre in Perth, Scotland. It was held in conjunction with the 2012 Scottish Women's Curling Championship. The winner of the championship, Tom Brewster, represented Scotland at the 2012 Capital One World Men's Curling Championship in Basel, Switzerland.

Teams
The teams are listed as follows:

Round-robin standings
Final round-robin standings

Round-robin results
All times listed in Western European Time (UTC+0).

Draw 1
Monday, February 13, 4:15 pm

Draw 2
Tuesday, February 14, 8:00 am

Draw 3
Tuesday, February 14, 4:00 pm

Draw 4
Wednesday, February 15, 12:00 pm

Draw 5
Wednesday, February 15, 8:00 pm

Draw 6
Thursday, February 16, 12:00 pm

Draw 7
Thursday, February 16, 8:00 pm

Draw 8
Friday, February 17, 8:00 am

Draw 9
Friday, February 17, 4:00 pm

Tiebreakers

Round 1
Friday, February 17, 8:30 pm

Round 2
Saturday, February 18, 9:00 am

Playoffs

1 vs. 2 Game
Saturday, February 18, 2:30 pm

3 vs. 4 Game
Saturday, February 18, 2:30 pm

Semifinal
Saturday, February 18, 7:40 pm

Final
Sunday, February 19, 3:10 pm

References

External links
Scottish Men's Curling Championship

2012 in curling
2012 in Scottish sport
Scottish Men's Curling Championship
Cham